Carole Lombard (born Jane Alice Peters; October 6, 1908 – January 16, 1942) was an American actress, particularly noted for her energetic, often off-beat roles in screwball comedies. In 1999, the American Film Institute ranked Lombard 23rd on its list of the greatest female stars of Classic Hollywood Cinema.

Lombard was born into a wealthy family in Fort Wayne, Indiana, but was raised in Los Angeles by her single mother. At 12, she was recruited by director Allan Dwan and made her screen debut in A Perfect Crime (1921). Eager to become an actress, she signed a contract with the Fox Film Corporation at age 16, but mainly played bit parts and was dropped after a year. Her career came close to ending shortly before her 19th birthday when a shattered windshield from a car accident left a scar on her face, but she overcame this challenge and appeared in 15 short comedies for Mack Sennett between 1927 and 1929, and then began appearing in feature films such as High Voltage (1929) and The Racketeer (1929). After a successful appearance in The Arizona Kid (1930), she was signed to a contract with Paramount Pictures.

Paramount quickly began casting Lombard as a leading lady, primarily in drama films. Her profile increased when she married William Powell in 1931, but the couple divorced amicably after two years. A turning point in Lombard's career came when she starred in Howard Hawks's pioneering screwball comedy Twentieth Century (1934). The actress found her niche in this genre, and continued to appear in films such as Hands Across the Table (1935) (forming a popular partnership with Fred MacMurray), My Man Godfrey (1936), for which she was nominated for the Academy Award for Best Actress, and Nothing Sacred (1937). At this time, Lombard married "The King of Hollywood", Clark Gable, and the supercouple gained much attention from the media. Keen to win an Oscar, Lombard began to move towards more serious roles at the end of the decade. Unsuccessful in this aim, she returned to comedy in Alfred Hitchcock's Mr. & Mrs. Smith (1941) and Ernst Lubitsch's To Be or Not to Be (1942), her final film role.

Lombard's career was cut short when she died at the age of 33 aboard TWA Flight 3, which crashed on Mount Potosi, Nevada, while returning from a war bond tour. Today, she is remembered as one of the definitive actresses of the screwball comedy genre and American comedy, and as an icon of American cinema.

Life and career

Early life and education (1908–1920)
Lombard was born in Fort Wayne, Indiana, on October 6, 1908, at 704 Rockhill Street. Christened with the name Jane Alice Peters, she was the third child and only daughter of Frederic Christian Peters (1875–1935) and Elizabeth Jayne "Bessie" (Knight) Peters (1876–1942). Her two older brothers, with whom she was close, both growing up and in adulthood, were Frederic Charles (1902–1979) and John Stuart (1906–1956). Lombard's parents both descended from wealthy families and her early years were lived in comfort, with biographer Robert Matzen calling it her "silver spoon period". The marriage between her parents was strained, however, and in October 1914, her mother took the children and moved to Los Angeles. Although the couple did not divorce, the separation was permanent. Her father's continued financial support allowed the family to live without worry, if not with the same affluence they had enjoyed in Indiana, and they settled into an apartment near Venice Boulevard in Los Angeles.

Described by her biographer Wes Gehring as "a free-spirited tomboy", the young Lombard was passionately involved in sports and enjoyed watching movies. At Virgil Junior High School, she participated in tennis, volleyball, and swimming, and won trophies for her achievements in athletics. At the age of 12, this hobby unexpectedly landed Lombard her first screen role. While playing baseball with friends, she caught the attention of the film director Allan Dwan, who later recalled seeing "a cute-looking little tomboy ... out there knocking the hell out of the other kids, playing better baseball than they were. And I needed someone of her type for this picture." With the encouragement of her mother, Lombard happily took a small role in the melodrama A Perfect Crime (1921). She was on set for two days, playing the sister of Monte Blue. Dwan later commented, "She ate it up".

Career beginnings and Fox contract (1921–26)

A Perfect Crime was not widely distributed, but the brief experience spurred Lombard and her mother to seek more film work, and she participated unsuccessfully in several auditions. While appearing as the queen of Fairfax High School's May Day Carnival at the age of 15, Lombard was scouted by an employee of Charlie Chaplin and offered a screen test to appear in his film The Gold Rush (1925). Lombard did not win the role, but the test raised awareness of her promising talent in Hollywood. Her test was seen by the Vitagraph Film Company, which expressed interest in signing her to a contract. Although this did not materialize, the condition that she adopt a new first name (as Jane was considered too dull) lasted with Lombard throughout her career. She selected the name Carole after a girl with whom she played tennis in middle school.

In October 1924, shortly after these disappointments, 16-year-old Lombard was signed to a contract with the Fox Film Corporation. Lombard's mother contacted gossip columnist Louella Parsons, who arranged a screen test. According to biographer Larry Swindell, Lombard's beauty convinced studio head Winfield Sheehan to sign her to a $75-per-week contract, and abandoned her schooling to pursue the new career. Fox approved of the name Carole, but unlike Vitagraph, it disliked her surname. She was renamed Carole Lombard, with the new surname adopted from that of a family friend.

Most of Lombard's appearances with Fox were bit parts in low-budget Westerns and adventure films. She later commented on her dissatisfaction with these roles: "All I had to do was simper prettily at the hero and scream with terror when he battled with the villain." However, she enjoyed the other aspects of film work such as photo shoots, costume fittings, and socializing with actors on the studio set. Lombard embraced the flapper lifestyle and became a regular at the Cocoanut Grove nightclub, where she won several Charleston dance competitions.

In March 1925, Fox awarded Lombard a leading role in the drama Marriage in Transit opposite Edmund Lowe. Her performance was received well, and a reviewer for Motion Picture News wrote that Lombard displayed "good poise and considerable charm." However, the studio heads were unconvinced that Lombard was leading-lady material, and her one-year contract was not renewed. Gehring has suggested that a facial scar resulting from an automobile accident was a factor in this decision, but the crash occurred nearly two years later on September 9, 1927.

According to historian Olympia Kiriakou, on the night of the accident, Lombard was on a date with a man named Harry Cooper. As they were driving down Santa Monica Boulevard, Cooper crashed into another car; the windshield shattered and shards of glass cut "Lombard’s face from her nose and across her left cheek to her eye." Lombard underwent reconstructive surgery and faced a long recovery period. For the remainder of her career, Lombard learned to hide the mark with makeup and careful lighting. At the time of the accident, Lombard was already under contract with Mack Sennett. In October 1927, Lombard and her mother Bess sued Cooper for $35,000 in damages, citing in the lawsuit that "where she formerly was able to earn a salary of $300 monthly as a Sennett girl, she is now unable to obtain employment of any kind." The lawsuit was settled out of court, and Lombard received $3,000. Although Lombard feared that the accident would end her career, Sennett pledged to help her recover. He afforded her "lucrative film roles and ample publicity," including the nickname "Carole of the Curves". Kiriakou explains, "the nickname simultaneously drew audiences’ focus away from her facial scars and worked harmoniously with the physicality and female sensuality that were emblematic of Lombard's performances" in Sennett's films.

Breakthrough and early success (1927–29)

Although Lombard initially had reservations about performing in slapstick comedies, she joined Sennett's company as one of the Sennett Bathing Beauties. She appeared in 18 short films (all as Lillian Smith in the Smith Family series) between September 1927 and March 1929, and enjoyed her time at the studio. Lombard's first experiences in comedy provided valuable training for her future comedic work. In 1940, she called her Sennett years "the turning point of [my] acting career."

Sennett's productions were distributed by Pathé Exchange, and the company began casting Lombard in feature films. She had prominent roles in Show Folks and Ned McCobb's Daughter (both 1928), and reviewers observed that she made a "good impression" and was "worth watching." The following year, Pathé elevated Lombard from a supporting player to a leading lady. Her success in Raoul Walsh's picture Me, Gangster (also 1928), opposite June Collyer and Don Terry in his film debut, finally eased the pressure that her family had been exerting for her to succeed. In Howard Higgin's High Voltage (1929), Lombard's first talking picture, she played a criminal in the custody of a deputy sheriff, both of whom are among bus passengers stranded in deep snow. Her next film, the comedy Big News (1929), cast her opposite Robert Armstrong and was a critical and commercial success. Lombard was reunited with Armstrong for the crime drama The Racketeer, released in late 1929. The review in Film Daily wrote: "Carol Lombard proves a real surprise, and does her best work to date. In fact, this is the first opportunity she has had to prove that she has the stuff to go over."

Paramount contract and first marriage (1930–33)

Lombard returned to Fox for a one-off role in the Western The Arizona Kid (1930). It was a big release for the studio, starring the popular actor Warner Baxter, in which Lombard received third billing. Following the success of the film, Paramount Pictures recruited Lombard and signed her to a $350-per-week contract, gradually increasing to $3,500 per week by 1936. They cast her in the Buddy Rogers comedy Safety in Numbers (also 1930), and one critic observed of her work, "Lombard proves [to be] an ace comedienne." For her second assignment, Fast and Loose (also 1930) with Miriam Hopkins, Paramount mistakenly credited the actress as "Carole Lombard". She decided she liked this spelling and it became her permanent screen name.

Lombard appeared in five films released during 1931, beginning with the Frank Tuttle comedy It Pays to Advertise. Her next two films, Man of the World and Ladies Man, both featured William Powell, Paramount's top male star. Lombard had been a fan of the actor before they met, attracted to his good looks and debonair screen persona, and they were soon in a relationship. The differences between the pair have been noted by biographers: she was 22, carefree, and famously foul-mouthed, while he was 38, intellectual, and sophisticated. Despite their disparate personalities, Lombard married Powell on June 26, 1931, at her Beverly Hills home. Talking to the media, she argued for the benefits of "love between two people who are diametrically different", claiming that their relationship allowed for a "perfect see-saw love".

The marriage to Powell increased Lombard's fame, while she continued to please critics with her work in Up Pops the Devil and I Take this Woman (both 1931). In reviews for the latter film, which co-starred Gary Cooper, several critics predicted that Lombard was set to become a major star. She went on to appear in five films throughout 1932. No One Man and Sinners in the Sun were not successful, but Edward Buzzell's romantic picture Virtue was well received. After featuring in the drama No More Orchids, Lombard was cast as the wife of a con artist in No Man of Her Own. Her co-star for the picture was Clark Gable, who was rapidly becoming one of Hollywood's top stars. The film was a critical and commercial success, and Wes Gehring writes that it was "arguably Lombard's finest film appearance" to that point. It was the only picture that Gable and Lombard, future husband and wife, made together. There was no romantic interest at this time, however, as she recounted to Garson Kanin: "[we] did all kinds of hot love scenes ... and I never got any kind of tremble out of him at all".

In August 1933, Lombard and Powell divorced after 26 months of marriage, although they remained very good friends until the end of Lombard's life. At the time, she blamed it on their careers, but in a 1936 interview, she admitted that this "had little to do with the divorce. We were just two completely incompatible people". 

She appeared in five films that year, beginning with the drama From Hell to Heaven and continuing with Supernatural, her only horror vehicle. After a small role in The Eagle and the Hawk, a war film starring Fredric March and Cary Grant, she starred in two melodramas: Brief Moment, which critics enjoyed, and White Woman, where she was paired with Charles Laughton.

Lombard was involved romantically with Russ Columbo, the famous crooner killed in a tragic accident in 1934. Lombard had been guiding Columbo's movie and radio career and told Sonia Lee of Mirror magazine in 1934 that they had been engaged. Other press outlets had reported on their relationship earlier that year; Screenland Magazine declared, “the Russ Columbo and Carole Lombard romance is one of Hollywood’s most charming.”

Success in screwball comedies (1934–35)

The year 1934 marked a high point in Lombard's career. She began with Wesley Ruggles's musical drama Bolero, where George Raft and she showcased their dancing skills in an extravagantly staged performance to Maurice Ravel's Boléro. Before filming began, she was offered the lead female role in It Happened One Night, but turned it down because of scheduling conflicts with this production. Bolero was favorably received, while her next film, the musical comedy We're Not Dressing with Bing Crosby, was a box-office hit.

Lombard was then recruited by the director Howard Hawks, a second cousin, to star in his screwball comedy film Twentieth Century  which proved a watershed in her career and made her a major star. Hawks had seen the actress inebriated at a party, where he found her to be "hilarious and uninhibited and just what the part needed", and she was cast opposite John Barrymore. In Twentieth Century, Lombard plays an actress who is pursued by her former mentor, a flamboyant Broadway impresario. Hawks and Barrymore were unimpressed with her work in rehearsals, finding that she was "acting" too hard and giving a stiff performance. The director encouraged Lombard to relax, be herself, and act on her instincts. She responded well to this tutoring, and reviews for the film commented on her unexpectedly "fiery talent"—"a Lombard like no Lombard you've ever seen". The Los Angeles Times''' critic felt that she was "entirely different" from her formerly cool, "calculated" persona, adding, "she vibrates with life and passion, abandon and diablerie".

The next films in which Lombard appeared were Henry Hathaway's Now and Forever (1934), featuring Gary Cooper and the new child star Shirley Temple, and Lady by Choice (1934), which was a critical and commercial success. The Gay Bride (1934) placed her opposite Chester Morris in a gangster comedy, but this outing was panned by critics. After reuniting with George Raft for another dance picture, Rumba (1935), Lombard was given the opportunity to repeat the screwball success of Twentieth Century. In Mitchell Leisen's Hands Across the Table (1935), she portrays a manicurist in search of a rich husband, played by Fred MacMurray. Critics praised the film, and Photoplay's reviewer stated that Lombard had reaffirmed her talent for the genre. It is remembered as one of her best films, and the pairing of Lombard and MacMurray proved so successful that they made three more pictures together.

Critical recognition (1936–37)

Lombard's first film of 1936 was Love Before Breakfast, described by Gehring as "The Taming of the Shrew, screwball style". In William K. Howard's The Princess Comes Across, her second comedy with MacMurray, she played a budding actress who wins a film contract by masquerading as a Swedish princess. The performance was considered a satire of Greta Garbo, and was widely praised by critics. Lombard's success continued as she was recruited by Universal Studios to star in the screwball comedy My Man Godfrey (1936). William Powell, who was playing the eponymous Godfrey, insisted on her being cast as the female lead; despite their divorce, the pair remained friendly and Powell felt she would be perfect in the role of Irene, a zany heiress who employs a "forgotten man" as the family butler. The film was directed by Gregory LaCava, who knew Lombard personally and advised that she draw on her "eccentric nature" for the role. She worked hard on the performance, particularly with finding the appropriate facial expressions for Irene. My Man Godfrey was released to great acclaim and was a box office hit. It received six nominations at the 9th Academy Awards, including Lombard for Best Actress. Biographers cite it as her finest performance, and Frederick Ott says it "clearly established [her] as a comedienne of the first rank."

By 1937, Lombard was one of Hollywood's most popular actresses, and also the highest-paid star in Hollywood following the deal which Myron Selznick negotiated with Paramount that brought her $450,000,  more than five times the salary of the U.S. President. As her salary was widely reported in the press, Lombard stated that 80 percent of her earnings went in taxes, but that she was happy to help improve her country. The comments earned her much positive publicity, and President Franklin D. Roosevelt sent her a personal letter of thanks.

Her first release of the year was Leisen's Swing High, Swing Low, a third pairing with MacMurray. The film focused on a romance between two cabaret performers, and was a critical and commercial success. It had been primarily a drama, with occasional moments of comedy, but for her next project, Nothing Sacred, Lombard returned to the screwball genre. Producer David O. Selznick, impressed by her work in My Man Godfrey, was eager to make a comedy with the actress and hired Ben Hecht to write an original screenplay for her. Nothing Sacred, directed by William Wellman and co-starring Fredric March, satirized the journalism industry and "the gullible urban masses". Lombard portrayed a small-town girl who pretends to be dying and finds her story exploited by a New York reporter. Marking her only appearance in Technicolor, the film was highly praised and was one of Lombard's personal favorites.

Lombard continued with screwball comedies, next starring in what Swindell calls one of her "wackiest" films, True Confession (1937). She played a compulsive liar who wrongly confesses to murder. Lombard loved the script and was excited about the project, which reunited her with John Barrymore and was her final appearance with MacMurray. Her prediction that it "smacked of a surefire success" proved accurate, as critics responded positively and it was popular at the box office.

Dramatic efforts and second marriage (1938–40)True Confession was the last film Lombard made on her Paramount contract, and she remained an independent performer for the rest of her career. Her next film was made at Warner Bros., where she played a famous actress in Mervyn LeRoy's Fools for Scandal (1938). The comedy met with scathing reviews and was a commercial failure, with Swindell calling it "one of the most horrendous flops of the thirties".Fools for Scandal was the only film Lombard made in 1938. By this time, she was devoted to her relationship with Clark Gable. Four years after their teaming on No Man of Her Own, the pair had reunited at a Hollywood party and began a romance early in 1936. The media took great interest in their partnership and frequently questioned if they would wed. Gable was separated from his wife, Ria Langham, but she did not want to grant him a divorce. As his relationship with Lombard became serious, Langham eventually agreed to a settlement worth half a million dollars. The divorce was finalized in March 1939, and Gable and Lombard eloped in Kingman, Arizona, on March 29. The couple, both lovers of the outdoors, bought a 20-acre ranch in Encino, California, where they kept barnyard animals and enjoyed hunting trips. Almost immediately, Lombard wanted to start a family, but her attempts failed; after two miscarriages and numerous trips to fertility specialists, she was unable to have children. In early 1938, Lombard officially joined the Baháʼí Faith, which her mother had been a member of since 1922.

While continuing with a slower work-rate, Lombard decided to move away from comedies and return to dramatic roles. She appeared in a second David O. Selznick production, Made for Each Other (1939), which paired her with James Stewart to play a couple facing domestic difficulties. Reviews for the film were highly positive, and praised Lombard's dramatic effort; financially, it was a disappointment. Lombard's next appearance came opposite Cary Grant in the John Cromwell romance In Name Only (1939), a credit she personally negotiated with RKO Radio Pictures upon hearing of the script and Grant's involvement. The role mirrored her recent experiences, as she played a woman in love with a married man whose wife refuses to divorce. She was paid $150,000 for the film, continuing her status as one of Hollywood's highest-paid actresses, and it was a moderate success.

Lombard was eager to win an Academy Award, and selected her next project—from several possible scripts—with the expectation that it would bring her the trophy. Vigil in the Night (1940), directed by George Stevens, featured Lombard as a nurse who faces a series of personal difficulties. Although the performance was praised, she did not get her nomination, as the sombre mood of the picture turned audiences away and box-office returns were poor. Despite the realization that she was best suited to comedies, Lombard completed one more drama: They Knew What They Wanted (1940), co-starring Charles Laughton, which was mildly successful.

Final roles (1941–42)

Accepting that "my name doesn't sell tickets to serious pictures", Lombard returned to comedy for the first time in three years to film Mr. & Mrs. Smith (1941), about a couple who learns that their marriage is invalid, with Robert Montgomery. Lombard was influential in bringing Alfred Hitchcock, whom she knew through David O. Selznick, to direct one of his most atypical films. It was a commercial success, as audiences were happy with what Swindell calls "the belated happy news ... that Carole Lombard was a screwball once more."

It was nearly a year before Lombard committed to another film, as she focused instead on her home and marriage. Determined that her next film be "an unqualified smash hit", she was also careful in selecting a new project. Through her agent, Lombard heard of Ernst Lubitsch's upcoming film: To Be or Not to Be (1942), a dark comedy that satirized the Nazi takeover of Poland. The actress had long wanted to work with Lubitsch, her favorite comedy director, and felt that the material—although controversial—was a worthy subject. Lombard accepted the role of actress Maria Tura, despite it being a smaller part than she was used to, and was given top billing over the film's male lead, Jack Benny. Filming took place in the fall of 1941, and was reportedly one of the happiest experiences of Lombard's career.

Death

When the U.S. entered World War II at the end of 1941, Lombard traveled to her home state of Indiana for a war bond rally with her mother, Bess Peters, and Clark Gable's press agent, Otto Winkler. Lombard raised more than $2 million in defense bonds in a single evening. Her party had initially been scheduled to return to Los Angeles by train, but Lombard was eager to reach home more quickly and wanted to travel by air. Her mother and Winkler were afraid of flying and insisted that the group follow their original travel plans. Lombard suggested that they flip a coin; they agreed, and Lombard won the toss.

In the early morning hours of January 16, 1942, Lombard, her mother and Winkler boarded a Transcontinental and Western Air Douglas DST (Douglas Sleeper Transport) aircraft to return to California. All 22 aboard, including Lombard, her mother, and 15 U.S. Army soldiers, were killed instantly. Lombard was 33 years old. The cause of the crash was attributed to the flight crew's inability to properly navigate over the mountains surrounding Las Vegas. As a precaution against the possibility of enemy Japanese bomber aircraft coming into American airspace from the Pacific, safety beacons normally used to direct night flights had been turned off, leaving the pilot and crew of the TWA flight without visual warnings of the mountains in their flight path. Some of the aircraft crash wreckage remains on Potosi, although it is very difficult to find due to slope and brush.

Aftermath
Lombard's funeral was January 21 at Forest Lawn Memorial Park Cemetery in Glendale, California. She was interred beside her mother under the name of Carole Lombard Gable. Despite remarrying twice following her death, Gable was interred beside Lombard when he died in 1960.

Lombard's final film, To Be or Not to Be, directed by Ernst Lubitsch and co-starring Jack Benny, a satire about Nazism and World War II, was in post-production at the time of her death. Allegedly, it has been said that film's producers decided to cut a line in which Lombard's character asks, "What can happen on a plane?" out of respect for the circumstances surrounding her death. However, there is no indication that this line existed and was removed posthumously, according to the film's PSA file. When The Jack Benny Program aired on January 18, Jack Benny did not attend the live radio broadcast. At its opening, announcer Don Wilson stated Jack would not appear that night, but did not explain why. The show that night did not feature any comedy, just musical numbers. Lombard had been scheduled to appear on the following Sunday's broadcast.

At the time of her death, Lombard had been scheduled to star in the film They All Kissed the Bride; when production started, she was replaced by Joan Crawford. Crawford donated all of her salary for the film to the Red Cross, which had helped extensively in the recovery of bodies from the air crash. 

Shortly after Lombard's death, Gable, who was inconsolable and devastated by his loss, joined the United States Army Air Forces. Lombard had asked him to do that numerous times after the United States had entered World War II. After officer training, Gable headed a six-man motion picture unit attached to a B-17 bomb group in England to film aerial gunners in combat, flying five missions himself. In December 1943, the United States Maritime Commission announced that a Liberty ship named in her honor would be launched. Gable attended the launch of the SS Carole Lombard on January 15, 1944, the two-year anniversary of Lombard's war bond drive. The ship was involved in rescuing hundreds of survivors from sunken ships in the Pacific and returning them to safety.

In 1962, Jill Winkler Rath, widow of publicist Otto Winkler, filed a $100,000 lawsuit against the $2,000,000 estate of Clark Gable in connection with Winkler's death. The suit was dismissed in Los Angeles Superior Court. Rath, in her action, claimed Gable promised to provide financial aid for her if she would not bring suit against the airline involved. Rath stated she later learned that Gable settled his claim against the airline for $10. He did so because he did not want to repeat his grief in court and subsequently provided her no financial aid in his will."Woman Suing Gable Estate For $100,000". The Hartford Courant. August 18, 1961.

Legacy

Author Robert D. Matzen has cited Lombard as "among the most commercially successful and admired film personalities in Hollywood in the 1930s", and feminist writer June Sochen believes that Lombard "demonstrated great knowledge of the mechanics of film making". George Raft, her co-star in Bolero, was extremely fond of the actress, remarking "I truly loved Carole Lombard. She was the greatest girl that ever lived and we were the best of pals. Completely honest and outspoken, she was liked by everyone".

Historian Olympia Kiriakou identifies Lombard as a progressive, feminist studio-era star. She describes Lombard's politics as "proto-feminist," explaining that "many of her political and social statements pre-date the second-wave feminist movement, yet were very much in line with the second wave’s focus," particularly her views about women's roles in the home and workplace. Lombard's independent star persona balanced her femininity and screen glamour with "male business sense." She was described by Photoplay columnist Hart Seymore as the "perfect example of a modern Career Girl," which was based on Lombard's capability to “live by the logical premise that women have equal rights with men." In 1937, Photoplay published an article about Lombard's business acumen entitled "Carole Lombard tells: 'How I Live by a Man's Code'," in which she offers readers rules for how to be successful in business and at home such as "“play fair [with men]...don’t burn over criticism - stand up to it like a man." Notably, in the article Lombard tells readers that she “doesn’t believe in a man’s world,” and encourages women to “work - and like it," adding: “All women should have something worthwhile to do, and cultivate efficiency at it, whether it be housekeeping or raising chickens. Working women are interesting women." But as Kiriakou explains, such an article was published in order "to elicit a specific response from the fan magazine readers - namely, to view Lombard’s independent star as indistinguishable from the Lombard heroines they saw on screen."

Moreover, according to scholar Emily Carman, Lombard's independent female star persona was able to emerge only when she “attained greater professional autonomy in the mid-1930s," ultimately leading her to become one of the first stars of the studio-era to go freelance. Freelancing gave Lombard more autonomy over her career decisions, and the types of roles she was able to play. Additionally, Lombard was the first Hollywood star to propose profit participation: in 1938, she negotiated with Selznick International Pictures to take a reduced salary of $100,000 in exchange for a 20 percent cut of the distributor's gross of $1.6 to $1.7 million, and subsequent smaller percentages as the gross increased. Carman explains that this contract also included a "no-loan out" clause, the right to employ Travis Banton as her costume designer of choice, as well as all legal rights to her image. Carman concludes that Lombard's strategic business sense and easy-going nature were central to her independent star persona, and the control she maintained over her career was a challenge to the “paternalistic structure” of the studio system.

Lombard was particularly noted for the zaniness of her performances, described as a "natural prankster, a salty tongued straight-shooter, a feminist precursor and one of the few stars who was beloved by the technicians and studio functionaries who worked with her". Life magazine noted that her film personality transcended to real life, "her conversation, often brilliant, is punctuated by screeches, laughs, growls, gesticulations and the expletives of a sailor's parrot". Graham Greene praised the "heartbreaking and nostalgic melodies" of her faster-than-thought delivery, whereas The Independent wrote, "Platinum blonde, with a heart-shaped face, delicate, impish features and a figure made to be swathed in silver lamé, Lombard wriggled expressively through such classics of hysteria as Twentieth Century and My Man Godfrey."

In 1999, the American Film Institute ranked Lombard 23rd on its list of the 25 greatest American female screen legends of classic Hollywood cinema, and she has a star on the Hollywood Walk of Fame, at 6930 Hollywood Blvd. Lombard received one Academy Award for Best Actress nomination, for My Man Godfrey. Actresses who have portrayed her in films include Jill Clayburgh in Gable and Lombard (1976), Sharon Gless in Moviola: The Scarlett O'Hara War (1980), Denise Crosby in Malice in Wonderland (1985), Anastasia Hille in RKO 281 (1999) and Vanessa Gray in Lucy'' (2003). Lombard's Fort Wayne childhood home has been designated a historic landmark. The city named the nearby bridge over the St. Mary's River the Carole Lombard Memorial Bridge.

Filmography

References

Notes

Citations

Bibliography

External links

 
 
 Carole Lombard at Virtual History
 Carole Lombard at Indiana Historical Bureau

1908 births
1942 deaths
20th-century American actresses
20th-century Bahá'ís
Accidental deaths in Nevada
Actors from Fort Wayne, Indiana
Actresses from Indiana
American Bahá'ís
American child actresses
American film actresses
American silent film actresses
Articles containing video clips
Burials at Forest Lawn Memorial Park (Glendale)
Fairfax High School (Los Angeles) alumni
Paramount Pictures contract players
Victims of aviation accidents or incidents in 1942
Victims of aviation accidents or incidents in the United States
United Service Organizations entertainers